Neo Chorio is the name of two towns in Cyprus :

Neo Chorio, Paphos, in Paphos District
Neo Chorio, Nicosia, in Nicosia District